Clifton Township is an inactive township in Randolph County, in the U.S. state of Missouri.

Clifton Township has the name of David Clifton, a pioneer citizen.

References

Townships in Missouri
Townships in Randolph County, Missouri